or  is the ninth largest glacier in mainland Norway. The glacier is located in Troms og Finnmark county. The  glacier lies in both Loppa and Kvænangen municipalities.

It is now  due to glacier shrinkage. The mountain Svartfjellet lies just north of the glacier in Loppa Municipality. That is another of the highest points in Finnmark county. The village of Alteidet in Kvænangen is located nearby, along the European route E6.

See also
 List of glaciers in Norway
 List of highest points of Norwegian counties

References 

Glaciers of Troms og Finnmark
Kvænangen
Loppa